Christopher Moloney (born August 4, 1977) is a Canadian writer and photographer. He is best known for his ongoing rephotography project entitled FILMography.

Biography 
Moloney was born in the Toronto suburb of York, Ontario, Canada. He attended St. Anthony Elementary School and North Park Secondary School in Brampton, Ontario. He studied radio and television arts at Ryerson University in Toronto.

Career 
After earning his degree, Moloney moved to New York City to work in television, most notably the Late Show with David Letterman and Erin Burnett OutFront.

In June 2012, he began experimenting with an on-location layering technique of holding up a black-and-white printout of a scene from a movie and taking another photograph.

The critics are divided on his work. Flare praised Moloney for "flawlessly [lining] up every brick in a building and curb on the street to make the visuals look as one" while The Atlantic was more critical, noting "the buildings don’t always line up perfectly; the colors seldom match" 

His photographs have been featured by a number of magazines including Esquire, Complex, Wired, Fast Company and Vanity Fair

In 2013, his photographs were part of exhibitions during the Cannes Film Festival and Ischia Film Festival.

In December 2011, Moloney was interviewed by The New York Times for an article called "Dark Days Behind It, Central Park Pulses at Night". During the interview, Moloney referred to Central Park as "boringly safe". The phrase caught on and, when the article was reprinted by other media outlets, it was included in the headline. Shortly after the article ran in The New York Times, New York magazine criticized Moloney's comments in a column called "Central Park Not Nearly As Rape-y at Night As It Used to Be".

Notable photographs 
 Annie Hall (1977) 
 The Avengers (2012)

References

External links 
 FILMography
 Tobias, Scott. "FILMography Tumbr matches movie frames with their real-life locations", The A.V. Club, September 14, 2012. Retrieved May 25, 2013.
 Puchko, Kristy. "Cool Tumblr Blog Puts Movies In Their Place", Cinema Blend, September 6, 2012. Retrieved May 25, 2013.
 "FILMography photographs movie stills in real world locations", Miramax, September 14, 2012. Retrieved May 25, 2013.
 Schiller, Jakob. "Recreating Famous Movie Scenes With a Cheap Printer and Camera", Wired, September 27, 2012. Retrieved May 25, 2013.
 Leon, Melissa. FILMography Tumblr Matches Film Stills With Real-Life Locations (PHOTOS) "FILMography Tumblr Matches Film Stills With Real-Life Locations", The Daily Beast, January 8, 2013. Retrieved May 25, 2013.
 "Movies Stills Aligned Against Their Exact Locations", My Modern Metropolis, December 22, 2012. Retrieved May 25, 2013.
 Stanley, Caroline. "Photos of Film Stills vs. Their Real Life Locations", Flavorwire, September 13, 2012. Retrieved May 25, 2013.
 "FILMography Tumblr Photoblog", Spot Cool Stuff. Retrieved May 25, 2013.
 Renninger, Bryce J. "Movie Lovers We Love: An Awesome Blog That Goes Back to the Spot Where Famous Scenes Were Shot", Indiewire, September 28, 2012. Retrieved May 25, 2013.
 Torgovnick, Kate. "In short: A different kind of cinematography, plus the tech to watch in 2013", TED, January 4, 2013. Retrieved May 25, 2013.
 "Christopher Moloney photographs movie stills on location for FILMography", MSN, September 16, 2012. Retrieved May 25, 2013.
 "How To Mix Ordinary Day-To-Day Life With Famous Hollywood Movies: A Canadian Guy Has Figured Out A Way To Do It", George Stroumboulopoulos Tonight, October 3, 2012. Retrieved May 25, 2013.

1977 births
Living people